Calaveras County Airport , also known as Maury Rasmussen Field, is a public airport located four miles (6 km) southeast of the central business district of San Andreas, in Calaveras County, California, United States. It is owned by the County of Calaveras.

Although most U.S. airports use the same three-letter location identifier for the FAA and IATA, Calaveras County Airport is assigned CPU by the FAA but has no designation from the IATA (which assigned CPU to Cururupu, Maranhão, Brazil).

Facilities and aircraft 

For the 12-month period ending September 21, 2005, the airport had 25,000 aircraft operations, an average of 68 per day, all of which were general aviation. There are 79 aircraft based at this airport: 98% single engine, 1% multi-engine and 1% ultralight.

References

External links 

Airports in California
Buildings and structures in Calaveras County, California
Transportation in Calaveras County, California